Marquess of Powis was a title in the Peerage of England. It was created in 1687 for William Herbert, 1st Earl of Powis. He had already succeeded his father as third Baron Powis in 1667 and had been created Earl of Powis in the Peerage of England in 1674; Marquess of Powis and Viscount Montgomery in 1687.  When James II went into exile in France, the Marquess followed him. He served as Comptroller of the Royal Household and his wife Elizabeth as Governess of the Royal children. He was rewarded in 1698 by the titles Duke of Powis and Marquess of Montgomery, but these titles in the Jacobite Peerage (though used) were not recognised in England.

The title of Baron Powis was created in the Peerage of England in 1629 for William Herbert. He was the son of Sir Edward Herbert, second son of William Herbert, 1st Earl of Pembroke and Anne Parr. This Herbert family were thus members of a junior branch of the prominent Welsh family headed by the Earl of Pembroke. The peerages became extinct on the death of the first Marquess's grandson, the third Marquess, in 1748.

Barbara, daughter of Lord Edward Herbert, younger son of the second Marquess of Powis and brother of the third Marquess, married Henry Arthur Herbert, who was created Earl of Powis in 1748. They inherited his estates. See this title for more information.

Baron Powis (1629)
William Herbert, 1st Baron Powis (c. 1573–1656) 
Percy Herbert, 2nd Baron Powis (c. 1600–1667) (had been created a Baronet, of Red Castle, in 1622)
William Herbert, 3rd Baron Powis (1626–1696) (created Earl of Powis in 1674)

Earl of Powis (1674)
William Herbert, 1st Earl of Powis (1626–1696) (created Marquess of Powis in 1687)

Marquess of Powis (1687)
William Herbert, 1st Marquess of Powis (1626–1696)
William Herbert, 2nd Marquess of Powis (1665–1745). Powis was the only son of William Herbert, 1st Marquess of Powis, and Lady Elizabeth Somerset. He married Mary Preston in 1695. They had six children: William Herbert, 3rd Marquess of Powis; Lord Edward Herbert; Lady Mary Herbert; Lady Anne Herbert; Lady Charlotte Herbert; and Lady Theresa Herbert. His second son, Edward (died 1734), married Henrietta Waldegrave, daughter of James Waldegrave, 1st Earl Waldegrave in July 1734. They had one child: Lady Barbara Herbert (1735–1786)
William Herbert, 3rd Marquess of Powis (1698–1748). Powis was the son of William Herbert, 2nd Marquess of Powis, and Mary Preston. He died unmarried in 1748.

See also
Earl of Pembroke
Earl of Powis

References

Dictionary of Welsh Biography.

Extinct marquessates in the Peerage of England
Noble titles created in 1687
Dukedoms in the Jacobite Peerage